Tandonia kusceri is a species of gastropods belonging to the family Milacidae.

Distribution 
The species is found in Europe and Northern America.

 nonindigenous in Slovakia since 2014

 It was reported in Ukraine in Odessa region since 1902. It was reported in western Ukraine since 2018.

References

Milacidae
Gastropods described in 1931